Jaak Lipso (18 April 1940 – 3 March 2023) was an Estonian professional basketball player who competed for the Soviet Union. He is the only Estonian basketball player who has won two medals at the Olympic Games. Lipso also won two medals at the FIBA World Championship and was a three-time Eurobasket champion with the Soviet Union national basketball team. He was a member of the Soviet Union national team from 1961 to 1970. After his active career Lipso became a basketball coach, and was elected to the Estonian Basketball Hall of Fame in 2010.

Lipso died on 3 March 2023, at age 82.

Club career 
Lipso's career started at the age of 16 when he joined TRÜ basketball team (now Tartu Ülikool/Rock) in 1956. He played there for four seasons winning two Soviet Estonian titles (1958, 1959). After that he played a season with Rīgas ASK in Soviet Latvia before moving to European powerhouse CSKA Moscow. He spent the next eight years with the team winning two Euroleague titles (1963, 1969) and six USSR League championship titles (1962–1966, 1969). Lipso then moved to Tallinna Kalev for two years and then to Harju KEK winning two more Soviet Estonian titles (1974, 1979).

Achievements

National Team 
 Olympic Games:  1964,  1968
 World Championships:  1967,  1970
 European Championships:  1963,  1965,  1967

Club 
 Euroleague Championship: 1963, 1969
 Soviet Union League Championship: 1962, 1963, 1964, 1965, 1966, 1969
 Estonian SSR Championship: 1958, 1959, 1971, 1974, 1979

References

Further reading

External links 
 Profile at databaseOlympics.com
 Profile at basketpedya.com

1940 births
2023 deaths
ASK Riga players
Basketball players from Tallinn
Basketball players at the 1964 Summer Olympics
Basketball players at the 1968 Summer Olympics
FIBA EuroBasket-winning players
Estonian men's basketball players
Korvpalli Meistriliiga players
Olympic basketball players of the Soviet Union
Olympic bronze medalists for the Soviet Union
Olympic medalists in basketball
Olympic silver medalists for the Soviet Union
PBC CSKA Moscow players
Soviet men's basketball players
1967 FIBA World Championship players
1970 FIBA World Championship players
Tartu Ülikool/Rock players
Estonian basketball coaches
Medalists at the 1968 Summer Olympics
Medalists at the 1964 Summer Olympics
FIBA World Championship-winning players
Centers (basketball)
KK Kalev players